Gordon Keith may refer to:

 Gordon Keith (radio host) ("The Great Gordo"), radio talk show host
 Gordon Keith (producer), American record producer